Episcea is a genus of tiger moths in the family Erebidae. The genus was described by Warren in 1901.

Species
 Episcea extravagans Warren, 1901
 Episcea sancta Warren, 1901

References

External links

 
Pericopina
Moth genera